The 2012–13 Rhode Island Rams basketball team represented the University of Rhode Island during the 2012–13 NCAA Division I men's basketball season. The Rams, led by first year head coach Dan Hurley, played their home games at the Ryan Center and were members of the Atlantic 10 Conference. They finished the season 8–21, 3–13 in A-10 play finish in a tie for 14th place. They failed to qualify for the Atlantic 10 tournament.

Roster

Schedule

|-
!colspan=9| Exhibition

|-
!colspan=9| Regular season

References

Rhode Island Rams men's basketball seasons
Rhode Island